Rink may refer to: 
 Ice rink, a surface of ice used for ice skating
 Figure skating rink, an ice rink designed for figure skating
 Ice hockey rink, an ice rink designed for ice hockey
 Speed skating rink, an ice rink designed for speed skating
 Curling rink, used to refer to both a curling team and the playing surface
 Roller rink, a surface used for roller skating or roller hockey

People
 Arno Rink (1940–2017), a German painter
 Hinrich Johannes Rink (1819 - 1893), Danish geologist. 
 Paul E. Rink (1916–2000), an American judge, lawyer, and politician
 Signe Rink (1836–1909), a Greenland-born Danish writer and ethnologist

Places
Rink Glacier (Sermerssuaq), W Greenland
Rink Glacier (Melville Bay), NW Greenland

See also
 The Rink (disambiguation)

pl:Lodowisko
simple:Rink